Achromobacter cycloclastes is a Gram-negative, aerobic bacterium from the genus Achromobacter. The complete genome of A. cycloclastes has been sequenced.

See also
 List of sequenced bacterial genomes

References 

Burkholderiales